Leonhart is a surname. Notable people with the surname include:

Carolyn Leonhart (born 1971), American jazz singer
Jay Leonhart (born 1940), American double bassist and singer-songwriter
Michael Leonhart (born 1974), American jazz trumpeter and multi-instrumentalist
Michele Leonhart (born 1956), American law enforcement officer
 Squall Leonhart, a fictional character from the video game Final Fantasy VIII